Igor Musatov (born September 23, 1987) is a Russian former professional ice hockey winger. He last played for Slovakian club, HC Slovan Bratislava of the Kontinental Hockey League (KHL).

On June 8, 2013, Musatov wed two-time Olympic Gold medalist Rhythmic gymnast Evgenia Kanaeva. However, the pair has since divorced due to Igor’s alcoholic problems and violent outburst when drunk, which caused a deep strain into the pair’s marriage.

Career statistics

References

External links

1987 births
Living people
Ak Bars Kazan players
Atlant Moscow Oblast players
Avangard Omsk players
Lokomotiv Yaroslavl players
HC Neftekhimik Nizhnekamsk players
Neftyanik Leninogorsk players
Salavat Yulaev Ufa players
HC Spartak Moscow players
HC Slovan Bratislava players
HC Vityaz players
Russian ice hockey left wingers
Russian expatriate sportspeople in Slovakia
Russian expatriate ice hockey people
Expatriate ice hockey players in Slovakia
Ice hockey people from Moscow